Tetrahydrothiophene is an organosulfur compound with the formula (CH2)4S.  The molecule consists of a five-membered saturated ring with four methylene groups and a sulfur atom. It is the saturated analog of thiophene. It is a volatile, colorless liquid with an intensely unpleasant odor. It is also known as thiophane, thiolane, or THT.

Synthesis and reactions
Tetrahydrothiophene is prepared by the reaction of tetrahydrofuran with hydrogen sulfide. This vapor-phase reaction is catalyzed by alumina and other heterogenous acid catalysts.

This compound is a ligand in coordination chemistry, an example being the complex chloro(tetrahydrothiophene)gold(I).

Oxidation of THT gives the sulfone sulfolane, which is of interest as a polar, odorless solvent:

Sulfolane is, however, more conventionally prepared from butadiene.

Natural occurrence
Both unsubstituted and substituted tetrahydrothiophenes are reported to occur in nature. For example, tetrahydrothiophene occurs as a volatile from Eruca sativa Mill. (salad rocket) while monocyclic substituted tetrahydrothiophenes have been isolated from Allium fistulosum 'Kujou', Allium sativum (garlic), Allium cepa (onion), Allium schoenoprasum (chives), and Salacia prinoides. Albomycins are a group of tetrahydrothiophene-ring containing antibiotics from streptomyces while biotin and neothiobinupharidine (and other nuphar alkaloids
), are examples of bicyclic and polycyclic tetrahydrothiophene-ring containing natural products, respectively.

Applications
Because of its smell, tetrahydrothiophene has been used as an odorant in LPG, albeit no longer in North America. It is also used as an odorant for natural gas, usually in mixtures containing tert-butylthiol.

Tetrahydrothiophene is a Lewis base classified as a soft base and its donor properties are discussed in the ECW model.

See also
Tetrahydrofuran
Thiophene

References 

Thiolanes
Solvents
Foul-smelling chemicals